Clonmel is an unincorporated community in Illinois Township, Sedgwick County, Kansas, United States.  It is located at Highway K42 and W 71st St S.

History
Clonmel was a station on the Kansas City, Mexico and Orient Railway.

A post office was opened in Clonmel in 1905, and remained in operation until it was discontinued in 1938. It was named after Clonmel in Ireland.

Education
The community is served by Clearwater USD 264 public school district.

References

Further reading

External links
 Sedgwick County maps: Current, Historic, KDOT

Unincorporated communities in Sedgwick County, Kansas
Unincorporated communities in Kansas